Flipmode Squad is a hip hop collective founded and fronted by rapper Busta Rhymes.  The first Flipmode album debuted in 1998 with The Imperial, Rampage and Rah Digga went on to record solo efforts. In the move to J Records in 2000, Lord Have Mercy left Flipmode Squad in preference of a solo career in 2000, feeling that Busta was holding him down. The original line up also included Serious, who after quickly leaving would later produce for artists on No Limit Records, and later acts like Show Money and M. Dollars who were signed to the label as independent artists. Underground MC Roc Marciano would also be signed to the label for a number of years before going the independent route.

A second Flipmode Squad release, Rulership Movement, was set for release in 2003 on J Records, but because of the label change to Aftermath it was never released. It was announced that the album might be released sometime in 2009,J-MOE was in the group until he went solo. The founding member, Busta Rhymes later joined Dr. Dre's Aftermath label in 2006, and Rah Digga & Spliff Star appeared alongside Busta in the "Touch It (Remix)" video. Rah Digga left the Flipmode Squad amicably a couple of years later and directed her solo career. Spliff Star continued to collaborate in forming the Conglomerate with Busta, along with founding his own label. DJ Scratch left Flipmode/The Conglomerate in 2009 but returned in 2011 with the new movement taking form. Reek da Villian left Flipmode in 2009, but because of business reasons, he then headed to the Conglomerate, as well. Various members continued to record with each other. Busta signed with Cash Money Records in 2011, taking his business there with him. As the Conglomerate, an official mixtape was released in 2012.

History
In 1993, Busta Rhymes first introduced the Flipmode Squad when he still was a part of former group Leaders of the New School, with the members being Brittle Lo and Cool Whip of the duo Cracker Jacks, Rampage the Last Boy Scout and Boy Wonder the Caped Crusader. The line-up changed up drastically with Rampage being the only remaining member of Flipmode.

Discography

Studio albums 

 1998: The Imperial

Mixtapes 
 2002: Arsenal for the Streets pt. 1
 2003: Arsenal for the Streets pt. 2 (The Full Court Press)
 2007: The Facelift pt. 1
 2007: The Full Course Meal
 2012: Catastrophic (as newly formed Conglomerate)

Singles 
 1998: "Everybody on the Line Outside"
 1998: "Run for Cover" (Promo)
 1998: "Cha Cha Cha"
 1999: "Rastaman Chant" (Bob Marley featuring Flipmode Squad) (from the album Chant Down Babylon)
 2002: "Here We Go"
 2002: "Just Chill"
 2003: "I Know What You Want" (Busta Rhymes featuring Mariah Carey & Flipmode Squad) (from the album It Ain't Safe No More)

Members

Note
artist name: Boy Wonder the Caped Crusader

in chronological order
 Busta Rhymes (1993–2011)
 Rampage (1993–2006)
 Brittle Lo (1993-1994)
 Cool Whip (1993-1994)
 Boy Wonder the Caped Crusader (1993-1994)
 Lord Have Mercy (1996–2000)
 Spliff Star (1996–2011)
 DJ Scratch (1996–2009, 2011–2014)
 Rah Digga (1997–2007)
 Baby Sham (1997–2008)
 Serious (1997–1998)
 Meka (1997–2003)
 Brady Lanter (1998–2014)
 Roc Marciano (1999–2001)
 M. Dollars (2003–2007)
 Labba (2003–2007)
 Chauncey Black (2004–2009)
 Reek Da Villian (2006–2009; 2011–2014)
 Papoose (2006–2008)
 Dready (2007–2014)
 Show Money (2007–2014)
 J-Doe (2008–2014)
 Seige Monstracity (2009–2014)
 DJ Ice Cold (2009–2014)
 Lonny Bereal (2010–2014)
 Nikki Grier (2010–2014)
 N.O.R.E. (2011–2014)

References 

Hip hop collectives
American hip hop groups
Musical groups established in 1996
2014 disestablishments in New York (state)
1996 establishments in New York (state)